This is a list of Whaling Walls, which are large outdoor murals by the American artist Robert Wyland (b. 1956), featuring images of life-size gray whales, breaching humpback whales, blue whales, and other sea life. Whaling Walls (a pun on the Wailing Wall) are created by invitation of the communities, institutions, and building owners of the structures on which they are painted.  His first mural was created in 1981, and Wyland's 100th Whaling Wall was painted in Beijing in 2008.

References

External links
 

Whaling Walls
Lost works of art
Murals
Whales in art